Rupert Edward Inglis (17 May 1863 – 18 September 1916) was an England international rugby player who later became a Church of England rector. During the First World War, Inglis was a chaplain to the British Army and was killed during the Battle of the Somme.

Early life and education
Inglis was born in the Hanover Square area of London. He was the youngest son of Nova Scotian Sir John Eardley Wilmot Inglis (1814–1862) (who died 8 months before Rupert was born) and Julia Selina Thesiger (1833–1904); his father commanded the British forces during the Siege of Lucknow in 1857. His mother, who was the daughter of Frederic Thesiger, the first Baron Chelmsford, Lord Chancellor, later wrote of her experiences during the siege including extracts from her diary.

He was educated at Rugby School from 1877 before going up to University College, Oxford in 1881 to read history. On leaving Oxford in 1885, he attended Ely Theological College and was ordained deacon in 1889.

Family
Inglis was the youngest of seven children. His siblings were:
 John Frederic Inglis (b. 1852, died an infant)
 John Frederic Inglis (1853–1923), who played cricket for Kent and football for Wanderers and Scotland
 Charles George Inglis (1855–1923), who became a tea planter on the Agra Kandy Estate in Ceylon.
 Alfred Markham Inglis (1856–1919), who played cricket for Kent
 Victoria Alexandrina Inglis (1859–1929), married Hubert Ashton, mother of cricketers Hubert, Gilbert, Percy and Claude
 Julia Mathilda Inglis (1861–1929), married to Sir George Herman Collier of the India Office

On 11 June 1900, he married Helen Mary Gilchrist. They had three children:
 Joan Clara Thesiger Inglis (1901–1967)
 John Gilchrist Thesiger Inglis (1906–1972) who was knighted and rose to the rank of Vice-Admiral.
 Margaret Cochran Inglis (1911–1994)

Sporting career
At Rugby School, Inglis was a member of the school cricket and rugby teams. 
He played cricket for M.C.C. against the school in June 1879, aged 16. He also played against Marlborough College in July 1881 when he was the top-scorer in the first innings, helping Rugby win the match by two wickets.

He was a member of the school rugby XV in 1879 and 1880 and also of the rugby XVs at Oxford University in 1883 and 1884, winning his Blue. Inglis became a member of the Blackheath rugby club and made three appearances for the England national rugby union team. His debut came against Wales at Rectory Field, Blackheath on 2 January 1886 in a match which England won on tries scored. This was followed by a victory over Ireland in February and a draw with Scotland in March. As a result, England shared the 1886 Home Nations Championship with Scotland.

Clerical career
Inglis was ordained deacon in 1889 by the Bishop of Beverley. He became curate at Helmsley from 1889 to 1890 and then at Basingstoke from 1892 to 1899 (being ordained priest by the Bishop of Winchester in 1894), before being appointed Rector of Frittenden, Kent in 1900.

On 13 April 1905, he read the committal part of the service during the funeral of his uncle, General Frederic Thesiger, Lord Chelmsford.

First World War
In 1915, Inglis decided that, if he was to encourage the young men of his village to sign up for the army, he would also have to volunteer. At the age of 51, therefore, he was commissioned as a Chaplain to the Forces, 4th Class on 5 July 1915; he was attached to 1st Battalion, King's Shropshire Light Infantry, arriving in France later in July 1915. For a short while he did duty at No. 23 General Hospital, Étaples, and then joined No. 21 Casualty Clearing Station at Corbie, near Albert. In December 1915, he was attached to the 16th Infantry Brigade, 6th Division, in the Ypres Salient.

Throughout his time at the front, he wrote home regularly either to his parishioners or to his wife. After the war, his widow edited the letters and privately published a volume as a record for their children and others. His explanatory letter to his parishioners opens the volume:

At first, his letters home are optimistic and bright but the tone changes as he spends more time close to the front. He arrived at Étaples on 5 July and spent his time there acting as a censor of soldier's letters home as well as giving spiritual guidance to the wounded and conducting Sunday worship. He also helped the soldiers write letters home to their wives and families.

On 20 September 1915, he was transferred to the casualty clearing station at Corbie, located in a former bicycle factory. As well as his spiritual work, he helped feed and dress the wounded patients. His first period of leave since enlisting came in November, when he spent a week home, before returning to the front. On his return passage, he was shipped from Southampton on a crowded troop ship.

Within a few weeks of returning to the front, he was again on the move; he was attached to the 16th Infantry Brigade, 6th Division, consisting of the 1st King's Shropshire Light Infantry, the 1st Buffs, the 2nd York and Lancasters and the 8th Bedfords. By 18 December, he was camped in a wood near Vlamertinghe where he met a fellow chaplain, Neville Talbot, son of the Bishop of Winchester, who had helped found the Toc H movement, and nursed him through a bout of flu.

By Christmas, Talbot had returned home on leave and Inglis was senior chaplain. On Christmas Day, he had church services in the morning and then was entertained with a band concert in the evening. There was no truce: "The firing was not heavy but there was some going on all day. . ."

By this time, his letters home regularly complained about the conditions, both in the field hospital ("You would love to see this hut – the untidiness of it beats anything I have ever seen", "It's awfully difficult to get coal here – our allowance is 1 ½ lbs. per head per day. It isn’t much, to keep this and the kitchen fire going") and in the battlefield generally ("[the] mud . . . beggars description, and is getting worse",  "the trenches are in an awful state; it is of course, quite impossible to drain them, as everything is flat").

He was able to return home on leave at the end of January 1916, but was soon "back in my little wooden hut'" again. He continued to spend his time ministering to the needs of the injured soldiers and helping them write letters home. He also assisted the surgeon in operations in the field hospital; in a letter to his daughter Joan in February he relates an anecdote about his work in the hospital:

After a brief spell at Calais in March, Inglis returned to the Ypres Salient where the brigade came under heavy bombardment, resulting in many casualties including the death of the Colonel, Edward Bourryau Luard (1870–1916) (son of General Richard Luard). Over the next few months, he was regularly on the move with the brigade, spending much of his time, when not involved with funerals and other church services, organising a shop to supply the soldiers and later acting as "Mess President", organising the canteen.

By mid September, he was at Ginchy; two days after the Battle of Ginchy, when the village was re-taken from the enemy, he describes walking across the battlefield: "Then I walked across country with them – a wonderful country, all shell holes and trenches – trenches which till recently were German." His final letter home was dated 17 September 1916 in which he describes his work with the stretcher bearers, bringing the wounded soldiers to the dressing station. His letter closes:

The following day, 18 September, he joined a party of stretcher-bearers, in order to help bring in the wounded. While doing this, he was struck by a fragment of shell and while his wound was being dressed a second shell killed him instantly. In his letter of condolence to Mrs. Inglis, Rev. Neville Talbot praised Inglis' bravery and gallantry: 

He was buried close to the battlefield at Ginchy; his body was not recovered after the end of the war.

Tributes
Apart from the letter from Neville Talbot, several other fellow officers sent tributes to Mrs. Inglis:

Memorials
Inglis' name is among the 72,000 dead with no known grave commemorated on the Thiepval Memorial. There is also a memorial to him at All Saints' Church, Basingstoke where he had served as a curate.

At Frittenden, he is commemorated on the War Memorial while the lychgate at St. Mary's church is dedicated to him; there is also a tablet to his memory in the chancel of the church. On Remembrance Sunday 2009, Inglis' nephew, Hubert Ashton, preached at St. Mary's church, Frittenden. Parishioners also visited Ginchy where a memorial service was held in honour of the First World War dead. A memorial to the students of the Ely Theological College is now at King's School, Ely.

References

External links
Entry on Inglis family tree
Memorial at All Saints, Basingstoke

1863 births
1916 deaths
People from Mayfair
People educated at Rugby School
Alumni of University College, Oxford
20th-century English Anglican priests
Military personnel from London
England international rugby union players
King's Shropshire Light Infantry officers
British Army personnel of World War I
British military personnel killed in the Battle of the Somme
World War I chaplains
English military chaplains
Royal Army Chaplains' Department officers
English people of Scottish descent
Inglis family